The Buffalo Stampede were a Roller Hockey International team based in Buffalo, New York that was founded in the second season of the RHI. The team played at the Buffalo Memorial Auditorium from 1994 to 1995.  The team won the 1994 RHI Murphy Cup.

On September 2, 1994, the Stampede won the Murphy Cup in their inaugural season with an 8-7 win against the Portland Rage in front of a record-setting 14,175 hometown fans at the Buffalo Memorial Auditorium.

The team folded after the 1995 season. The Phoenix Cobras moved to the Albany area and assumed all of the Stampede's player contracts. They then changed their name to the Empire State Cobras and split their games between Albany and Glens Falls, NY. The team was purchased and relocated to Buffalo where it played three more seasons as the Buffalo Wings.

All-time roster

Norm Bazin
Paul Beraldo
Chris Bergeron
Larry Blair
John Blessman
Scott Burfoot
Fred Carroll
Jason Cirone
Rick Corriveau
Pat Curcio
Joe Daly
Derek DeCosty
Bob Delorimiere
Lou Franceschetti
John Hendry
Steve Herniman
Alex Hicks
Jamey Hicks
Scott Humphrey
Tom Jaeggi
Dave Lemay
Jim MacDougal
Mark Major
Craig Martin
Chris Monzidelus
Claude Morin
Jay Neal
Tom Nemeth
Dale Reinig
Len Soccio
Jeff Triano
John Vecchiarelli
Nick Vitucci

Coaches

 Chris McSorley - 1994
 John Vecchiarelli - 1995 (Player Coach)
 Rob Ray - 1995 (Bench Coach)

Season-by-season record

Note: GP = Games played, W = Wins, L = Losses, T = Ties, OTL = Overtime Losses, Pts = Points, GF = Goals for, GA = Goals against, PIM = Penalties in minutes

References

Sports in Buffalo, New York
Roller Hockey International teams
Sports clubs established in 1994
Sports clubs disestablished in 1995
1994 establishments in New York (state)
1995 disestablishments in New York (state)
Phoenix Cobras